Physicians Mutual is a mutual insurance company headquartered in Omaha, Nebraska, United States. It consists of Physicians Mutual Insurance Company and Physicians Life Insurance Company.

Today the company offers a variety of insurance products, Medicare, Medigap, Medicare Supplement, Dental InsuranceTerm Life Insurance, Whole Life Insurance, and cancer  and funeral pre-planning services. In 2022, it began to offer Pet Insurance. 

The company holds over US$4 billion in assets and employs over 1000 people, and has Rob Reed as its president and chief executive officer.

History 

 1902 - Founded as Physicians Mutual Insurance Company  by Edwin E. Elliott, Physicians Mutual began by selling health insurance to medical professionals. 
 1962 - Policies were offered to the general public.
 1970 - The company expanded into life insurance when it founded Physicians Life Insurance Company.
 2012 -  To better address the increasing demands of funeral home owners and the families they represent, the company joined the funeral pre-planning business.
 2019 - Physicians Mutual Insurance Company introduced a new marketing advertisement featuring comedic actor John Michael Higgins.

References

External links 
 PhysiciansMutual.com

Insurance companies of the United States
Privately held companies based in Nebraska
American companies established in 1902
Financial services companies established in 1902
Companies based in Omaha, Nebraska
1902 establishments in Nebraska